The Datem del Marañón is one of the eight provinces in the Loreto Region of Peru. It was created on August 2, 2005 during the presidency of Alejandro Toledo.

Political division
The province is divided into six districts.

 Andoas (Alianza Cristiana)
 Barranca (San Lorenzo)
 Cahuapanas (Santa María de Cahuapanas)
 Manseriche (Saramiriza)
 Morona (Puerto Alegría)
 Pastaza (Ullpayacu)

References 
  Instituto Nacional de Estadística e Informática. Banco de Información Digital. Retrieved November 3, 2007.

Provinces of the Loreto Region